Aquatics at the 1990 Commonwealth Games consisted of Diving, Swimming and Synchronized Swimming. They were held in Henderson, New Zealand.

Diving

Swimming

Men's events

Women's events

Synchronised swimming

1990 Commonwealth Games events
1990
Commonwealth Games
International aquatics competitions hosted by New Zealand